The École nationale supérieure d'ingénieurs de Poitiers (ENSI Poitiers) is a French generalist engineering grande école in Poitiers, the regional capital of former Poitou-Charentes now part of Nouvelle-Aquitaine. Its focus is on the protection of the environment and is part of the University of Poitiers, one of the oldest universities in Europe.

History
Its roots come from Institut de sciences et techniques de Poitiers, a department of the University of Poitiers created in 1972. The Graduate Engineering School took over from it and was established in 1984. Then its buildings have been moved in 1996, in the campus, and it is located with the number B1.

At the beginning, the French grande école was called École supérieure d'ingénieurs de Poitiers (ESIP). In 2010 it changed its name.

The presidents of ENSIP were chronologically Michel Blanchard, Marcel Doré, Jean-Hugues Thomassin, Bernard Legube and Jean-Yves Chenebault.

Admission 

The admission is decided after concourse at the end of preparatory classes, a highly selective system. It is also possible to be admitted after a Diplôme universitaire de technologie for the best of their promotions.

Diploma 
Students can receive two diplomas: Energy and Water and civil engineering which lead to :
 The Energetic, systems and electrical Engineering department
 Energetics
 Lighting, Acoustics and Thermal studies
 Electrical Energy Optimization and Control
 Environment and Transportation
 The Environmental and Civil Engineering department
 Water and waste treatment
 Construction and Geotechnics

In partnership with Centrale Lille and ISAE-ENSMA,  ENSIP is a part of the prestigious International Master's Program in Turbulence. At the end of this highly selective two-year program, students are awarded a Master's Degree in Fluid Dynamics and Turbulence.

ENSIP students can also develop a double-competence with IAE Poitiers and their master's in business administration.

Three laboratories support the school:
 LIAS: a computer laboratory after the merge of LAII (Laboratoire Automatique et Informatique Industrielle) and on other laboratory.
 IC2MP: a chemical laboratory which gathers HYDRASA (HYDRogéologie, Argiles, Sols, Altération), LACCO (LAboratoire Catalyse en Chimie Organique) and LCME (Laboratoire Chimie et Microbiologie de l'Eau) from ENSIP and another one.
 Institut Pprime: a physical laboratory which regroups LEA (Laboratoire Etudes Aerodynamiques) and LET (Laboratoire Etudes Thermiques) from the ENSIP added by four more laboratories

Student life 
We call ENSIPiens people who study at ENSIP.

It is possible to play almost every sports, and it is even possible to play golf near the campus and sail in La Rochelle. Besides being part of the University of Poitiers and enjoy its facilities, the School has its own athletic teams in football, rugby, handball and volley.

The Festival du Film Environnemental, founded in 2010, is an annual film festival held in the school and presents short films about natural environment shot by non-professional French students.

The Journées Information Eaux is a biannual congress which gathers famous researchers and professionals in the water domain.

An international school 
Here are some universities who dealt partnerships:

Notes

External links 

  Official website
  AAEE, Alumni association of ENSIP
  Helios, the junior enterprise
  Festival du Film Environnemental

Universities and colleges in Poitiers
Engineering universities and colleges in France
Grandes écoles
University of Poitiers
Buildings and structures in Vienne
Educational institutions established in 1984
1984 establishments in France